This page is a complete chronological listing of the premiers of the Australian rules football competition known as the Victorian Football Association until 1995 and as the Victorian Football League since 1996. The Victorian Football Association was the top Victorian competition in Australian rules football from 1877 until 1896, and has been the second-tier Victorian competition since.

Each year, the premiership is awarded to the club which wins the VFL Grand Final. The Grand Final has been an annual tradition in its current format since 1933, and some form of Grand Final has been scheduled in each season since 1903 VFA season.

List of premiers

Premiership systems
Premierships are recognised for all seasons of VFA/VFL competition. Several different methods have existed to determine the premiers:
From 1877 until 1887, the premiership was a title given to the best performing team, determined largely by press consensus. These premierships, as well as premierships between 1870 and 1876 decided in the same manner prior to the foundation of the VFA, were at the time an informal title, but have since been considered official.
In 1888, the premiership became a formal competition controlled by the VFA. From 1888 until 1902, the premiership was determined based on win–loss record, with a playoff match played only in the event of teams finishing with equal records
From 1903 until 1932, the Argus system was in place, and the circumstances of the Grand Final could vary; in those years, the minor premiers had the right to challenge the winner of the finals series for the premiership, so the Grand Finals of this era are a mixture of challenge matches and non-challenge matches which would have been followed by challenge matches had the minor premier been defeated.
Since 1933, the premiership has been determined by a conventional Grand Final at the end of a finals series.

VFA/VFL Premiers

Division 2 premiers

Premierships by team
These tables summarise all senior premierships won by each team. The "Grand Final Matches" column includes all Grand Finals and Grand Final Replays listed in the previous section (including the forfeiture in 1904), and because of this, the column will not necessary equal the sum of the premierships and runners-up columns.

Division 1

Division 2

Grand Finals by venue
This table summarises the venues for all matches listed in the above table as Grand Finals, including Grand Final replays.

Division 1

Division 2

Consecutive premierships
A further eleven teams have won three premierships in a row, and a further thirteen teams have won back-to-back premierships.

Minor grades

Seconds/Reserves/Development League
Reserves teams for the VFA clubs competed in a dedicated competition from 1928 until 2017. This competition was known as the Victorian Junior Football Association until 1932, then throughout most of its history as the VFA Seconds, then later as the VFA Reserves, VFL Reserves and finally as the VFL Development League. The competition was disbanded at the end of 2017. As for the Seniors, the competition was played across two divisions between 1961 and 1988; clubs played in the same division as their senior teams.

Division 1

1928 Coburg (1)
1929 Coburg (2)
1930 Coburg (3)
1931 Brunswick (1)
1932 Brunswick (2)
1933 Brunswick (3)
1934 Coburg (4)
1935 Coburg (5)
1936 Brunswick (4)
1937 Coburg (6)
1938 Coburg (7)
1939 Coburg (8)
1940 Coburg (9)
1941 Williamstown (1)
1942 not contested
1943 not contested
1944 Port Melbourne (1)
1945 Yarraville (1)
1946 Prahran (1)
1947 Coburg (10)
1948 Williamstown (2)
1949 Port Melbourne (2)
1950 Coburg (11)

1951 Port Melbourne (3)
1952 Yarraville (2)
1953 Yarraville (3)
1954 Moorabbin (1)
1955 Williamstown (3)
1956 Williamstown (4)
1957 Preston (1)
1958 Coburg (12)
1959 Port Melbourne (4)
1960 Sandringham (1)
1961 Sandringham (2)
1962 Coburg (13)
1963 Brunswick (5)
1964 Port Melbourne (5)
1965 Port Melbourne (6)
1966 Williamstown (5)
1967 Waverley (1)
1968 Port Melbourne (7)
1969 Sandringham (3)
1970 Port Melbourne (8)
1971 Oakleigh (1)
1972 Port Melbourne (9)
1973 Port Melbourne (10)

1974 Port Melbourne (11)
1975 Coburg (14)
1976 Coburg (15)
1977 Sandringham (4)
1978 Preston (2)
1979 Sandringham (5)
1980 Port Melbourne (12)
1981 Dandenong (1)
1982 Sandringham (6)
1983 Preston (3)
1984 Preston (4)
1985 Preston (5)
1986 Williamstown (6)
1987 Preston (6)
1988 Springvale (1)
1989 Frankston (1)
1990 Coburg (16)
1991 Prahran (2)
1992 Frankston (2)
1993 Sandringham (7)
1994 Sandringham (8)
1995 Springvale (2)
1996 Port Melbourne (13)

1997 Frankston (3)
1998 North Ballarat (1)
1999 North Ballarat (2)
2000 Sandringham (9)
2001 Werribee (1)
2002 Williamstown (7)
2003 Williamstown (8)
2004 Port Melbourne (14)
2005 Williamstown (9)
2006 Box Hill (1)
2007 Coburg (17)
2008 Williamstown (10)
2009 Box Hill (2)
2010 Box Hill (3)
2011 Box Hill (4)
2012 Coburg (18)
2013 Williamstown (11)
2014 Williamstown (12)
2015 Williamstown (13)
2016 Box Hill (5)
2017 Casey (3)
Source where unlisted

Division 2

1961 Preston (1)
1962 Preston (2)
1963 Camberwell (1)
1964 Northcote (1)
1965 Prahran (1)
1966 Sunshine (1)
1967 Northcote (2)
1968 Northcote (3)

1969 Williamstown (1)
1970 Northcote (4)
1971 Brunswick (1)
1972 Brunswick (2)
1973 Caulfield (1)
1974 Coburg (1)
1975 Northcote (5)
1976 Frankston (1)

1977 Yarraville (1)
1978 Oakleigh (1)
1979 Yarraville (2)
1980 Williamstown (2)
1981 Camberwell (2)
1982 Springvale (1)
1983 Brunswick (3)
1984 Brunswick (4)

1985 Brunswick (5)
1986 Dandenong (1)
1987 Werribee (1)
1988 Werribee (2)
Source

Thirds
Under age teams, usually Under-19s but for brief periods Under-18s, for the VFA clubs competed in a dedicated competition between 1952 and 1994. This competition was known throughout most of its history as the VFA Thirds, and eventually as the VFA Under-19s. This competition was disbanded when the VSFL took over administration of the VFA in 1995. The competition was played across two divisions between 1961 and 1988, with the clubs playing in the same division as their senior team – with the exceptions of 1984 and 1985, when clubs from both divisions played in a unified thirds competition.

Division 1

1952 Port Melbourne (1)
1953 Moorabbin (1)
1954 Preston (1)
1955 Yarraville (1)
1956 Brunswick (1)
1957 Northcote (1)
1958 Williamstown (1)
1959 Preston (2)
1960 Preston (3)
1961 Coburg (1)
1962 Northcote (2)

1963 Northcote (3)
1964 Preston (4)
1965 Waverley (1)
1966 Sandringham (1)
1967 Sandringham (2)
1968 Sandringham (3)
1969 Sandringham (4)
1970 Prahran (1)
1971 Williamstown (2)
1972 Prahran (2)
1973 Sandringham (5)

1974 Preston (5)
1975 Oakleigh (1)
1976 Preston (6)
1977 Sandringham (6)
1978 Sandringham (7)
1979 Sandringham (8)
1980 Sandringham (9)
1981 Preston (7)
1982 Preston (8)
1983 Preston (9)
1984 Preston (10)

1985 Springvale (1)
1986 Williamstown (3)
1987 Williamstown (4)
1988 Coburg (2)
1989 Preston (11)
1990 Werribee (1)
1991 Frankston (1)
1992 Werribee (2)
1993 Port Melbourne (2)
1994 Sandringham (10)
Source

Division 2

1961 Preston (1)
1962 Preston (2)
1963 Sunshine (1)
1964 Prahran (1)
1965 Sunshine (2)
1966 Northcote (1)
1967 Oakleigh (1)
1968 Box Hill (1)

1969 Williamstown (1)
1970 Frankston (1)
1971 Sunshine (3)
1972 Geelong West (1)
1973 Caulfield (1)
1974 Northcote (2)
1975 Waverley (1)
1976 Box Hill (2)

1977 Waverley (2)
1978 Waverley (3)
1979 Williamstown (2)
1980 Northcote (3)
1981 Williamstown (3)
1982 Brunswick (1)
1983 Moorabbin (1983–1987) (1)
1984 not contested

1985 not contested
1986 Oakleigh (2)
1987 Waverley (4)
1988 Dandenong (1)
Source

Total premierships at all levels

Premierships in all three grades in a season
On six occasions did a club win premierships in all three grades in a single year. Preston achieved the feat in back-to-back seasons, and Williamstown also achieved the feat twice.

See also
List of VFA/VFL minor premiers

References

Sources
 Australian Football League
 Full Points Footy
 AFL Tables

Victorian Football League
Premiers
Victorian Football League premiers